Norway competed at the Summer Olympic Games for the first time at the 1900 Summer Olympics in Paris.  Results from Norwegian athletes are typically considered separate from those of Swedish competitors despite the Union between Sweden and Norway that existed in 1900.

Medalists
Norway finished in 16th position in the final medal rankings with 5 medals.

Results by event

Athletics

Two Norwegian athletes, a runner and a jumper, competed in four athletics events, winning one bronze medal in the pole vault.

Shooting

Norway won four medals in the five military rifle events, including the silver medal in the team section.  Østmo took bronze in the individual overall, as well as a silver and a bronze in two of the positions.

References

Nations at the 1900 Summer Olympics
1900
Olympics